Patrick Lee MacLeod (born June 15, 1969) is a Canadian former professional ice hockey defenceman who played in the National Hockey League for the Minnesota North Stars, San Jose Sharks and Dallas Stars in the 1990s. 

MacLeod was drafted 87th overall by the Minnesota North Stars in the 1989 NHL Entry Draft. MacLeod played 53 career NHL games, scoring 5 goals and 13 assists for 18 points. He was selected from Minnesota by the Sharks in the 1991 expansion draft, and scored two goals in the Sharks' first NHL game.

Career statistics

Awards
 WHL West Second All-Star Team – 1989

References

1969 births
Canadian expatriate ice hockey players in Sweden
Canadian ice hockey defencemen
Cincinnati Cyclones (IHL) players
Dallas Stars players
Färjestad BK players
Florida Everblades players
Ice hockey people from Saskatchewan
Kalamazoo Wings (1974–2000) players
Kamloops Blazers players
Kansas City Blades players
Living people
Milwaukee Admirals (IHL) players
Minnesota North Stars draft picks
Minnesota North Stars players
People from Melfort, Saskatchewan
San Jose Sharks players